Saint-Aubin-Montenoy is a commune in the Somme department in Hauts-de-France in northern France.

Geography

The area is 10.41 km2. It is situated at an elevation of 135 meters.

Population

See also
Communes of the Somme department

References

Communes of Somme (department)